Brunsbüttel is a town in the district of Dithmarschen, in Schleswig-Holstein, northern Germany that lies at the mouth of the Elbe river, near the North Sea. It is the location of the western entrance to the Kiel Canal.

History
The earliest reference to the town is in a document dated 14 July 1286.

 
With the construction of the Kiel Canal in 1911, the town was divided in two.

During the opening days of World War II, on 4 September 1939, the No. 149 Squadron RAF carried out the second bombing of that war, targeting warships near the town.

Economy 

Brunsbüttel became an industrial area in the 1960s and 1970s. The ChemCoast Park Brunsbüttel is still the most important enterprise zone and at  also the largest industrial area in Schleswig-Holstein.

Chemical Plants 

 Total S.A.
 Bayer MaterialScience
 Lanxess
 Sasol
 Yara International

Energy 

 Vattenfall: Gas Turbine Power Station (near the Brunsbüttel Nuclear Power Plant which is out of service)

 A terminal to import  of liquefied natural gas is under construction. Originally expected to become operational in approximately 2026, following the invasion of Ukraine by Russia it

Harbours 

 Brunsbüttel Ports GmbH (port operation and logistics)

Twin towns - sister cities

Brunsbüttel is twinned with:
 Horní Počernice (Prague 20), Czech Republic (2004)

Notable residents

 Jennifer Oeser (born 1983), athlete
 Karen Duve author

References

Dithmarschen
Populated riverside places in Germany
Populated places on the Elbe